The 1938 All-Ireland Senior Camogie Championship was the high point of the 1938 season in Camogie. The championship was won by Dublin, who defeated Cork by a six-point margin in the final.

Structure
Cork beat Waterford by 6–3 to nil in the Munster final. Antrim beat Cavan by 3–2 to 2–0 in the Ulster final. Eva Moran scored 2–1 as Dublin beat Antrim by three points in the semi-final in Belfast on a day that GAA President, Paddy McNamee, threw in the ball.

Final
Two late goals by Doreen Rogers gave Dublin victory over Cork in the All-Ireland Final on a heavy pitch at the Cork Athletic Grounds. The match was level with five minutes remaining.

Final stages

 
Match Rules
50 minutes
Replay if scores level
Maximum of 3 substitutions

See also
 All-Ireland Senior Hurling Championship
 Wikipedia List of Camogie players
 National Camogie League
 Camogie All Stars Awards
 Ashbourne Cup

References

External links
 Camogie Association
 Historical reports of All Ireland finals
 All-Ireland Senior Camogie Championship: Roll of Honour
 Camogie on facebook
 Camogie on GAA Oral History Project

1938 in camogie
1938